Do You Wanna Get Away is the second studio album by American singer Shannon. It was released in 1985 by Mirage/Atco/Atlantic Records.

Track listing

Original

2006 CD reissue bonus tracks

Personnel
Shannon: Main Vocal
April Lang, Audrey Wheeler, Cheryl Page, Cindy Mizelle, Evan Rogers, Jimi Tunnell, Selva Millheiser, Judith Spears: Vocal Backing
Nate Wingfield, Carl Sturken, Charlie Street, Tommy Morrongiello, Warner Fritzshing: Guitars
Phil Ashley, Joe Norosavage, Tommy Mandel: Keyboards
C.P. Roth: Keyboards, Keyboard and Drum programming, Percussion
Chris Barbosa: Keyboard and Drum Programming, Percussion
Jeff Bova: Keyboards, Effects
Russell Taylor, Tony Bridges: Bass
Petey Grayson: Percussion
Miami Horn Section arranged by Crispin McCormick

Chart positions 

"Stronger Together" (second single)

References

1985 albums
Shannon (singer) albums
Atco Records albums